Spyros Achilleos Kyprianou (28 October 1932 – 12 March 2002) was one of the most prominent politicians and barristers of modern Cyprus. He served as the second president of Cyprus from 1977 to 1988.

Spyrou Kyprianou Avenue in Nicosia was named after him posthumously, as well as a plethora of other streets across the island.

Early life and education
Kyprianou was born in Limassol in 1932. He studied Economics and Commerce at the City of London College and law at Gray΄s Inn. He also studied comparative law, receiving a diploma.

Political career
During the time he spent in London as a student, Kyprianou founded the National Union of Cypriot Students in England (E.F.E.K.A.) of which he was the first President. In 1952 he was appointed Secretary of Archbishop Makarios III in London and in 1954 he assumed responsibility for the Office of the Secretary of the Cyprus Ethnarchy in London, the major objective of which was to inform British public opinion on the Cyprus issue. This effort was intensified after the start of the liberation struggle in Cyprus in 1955. Due to this activity, he was forced to leave the UK in June 1956 and went to Greece. There, he collaborated with the Panhellenic Committee for Self-Determination for Cyprus which aimed to raise the profile of the Cyprus case on the international scene.

From August 1956 to March 1957, Kyprianou represented the Cyprus Ethnarchy in New York. Later, he was allowed to return to his London post as representative of the Cyprus Ethnarchy. He stayed in London until the signing of the London – Zurich Agreements for the independence of Cyprus and returned to Cyprus with Archbishop Makarios in March 1959.

During the transitional period after the signing of the agreements on Cyprus, Kyprianou represented the Greek Cypriot side at the Athens Conference for the drafting of the Agreement on the Application of the Tripartite Alliance (Cyprus – Greece – Turkey), this was provided for in the London – Zurich Agreements.

After the declaration of the independence of Cyprus in August 1960, the President of the Republic of Cyprus Archbishop Makarios appointed Kyprianou Minister of Justice and, a few days later, Minister of Foreign Affairs.

As Minister of Foreign Affairs, he repeatedly represented Cyprus at the UN Security Council, and in sessions of the U.N. General Assembly during debates on the Cyprus issue. He also participated in meetings of the Committee of Ministers of the Council of Europe, of which he served as Chairman from April to December 1967. In addition, he visited countries and represented Cyprus in negotiations with foreign governments.

In September 1964, in Moscow, he signed the Agreement for Soviet Military Aid to Cyprus.

He resigned from his post as Minister of Foreign Affairs on 5 May 1972, after a dispute with the military regime in Athens.

After this resignation, he worked as a lawyer and a legal counsellor. On 1 August 1974, following the coup of the Greek junta and the Turkish invasion in Cyprus, Kyprianou went to Athens where he had talks with the Government of National Unity, which took over following the collapse of the junta. He travelled between Athens and London where President Makarios was staying temporarily. In September 1974, he headed the Cyprus delegation to the General Assembly of the United Nations during the debate on Cyprus. In February 1975, he attended the Security Council meeting in New York as member of the Cyprus delegation.

On 12 May 1976, he announced the establishment of the Democratic Party. In the parliamentary elections of 5 September 1976, the Democratic Party won 21 seats out of a total of 35 in the House of Representatives, and Kyprianou was elected President of the House.

After the death of the President of the Republic Archbishop Makarios on 3 August 1977, Kyprianou became Acting President of the Republic, in accordance with the constitution. On 3 September 1977, he was unanimously elected President of the Republic to serve the remaining term of office of Archbishop Makarios.

Kyprianou's elder son Achilles was kidnapped by members of EOKA on the evening of 14 December 1977. Achilles was later released on 18 December.

In the presidential elections of 28 February 1978, and 13 February 1983, he was reelected as President of the Republic, the first time being elected unopposed. He was defeated by George Vassiliou at the elections in 1988.

As President of the Republic of Cyprus, he visited many countries and participated in sessions of the United Nations, as well as summit conferences of the Non-Aligned Movement and the Commonwealth of Nations.

Kyprianou was awarded medals of honour, distinctions and decorations by various countries. In 1985, the University of Belgrade awarded him an honorary doctorate.

Following the parliamentary elections of 26 May 1996, Kyprianou was elected President of the House of Representatives. He stepped down in 2001, ending a 30-year career in politics.

Family
Kyprianou married Mimi Pagathrokliton in 1956 and had two sons, Achilleas and Markos. His second son, Markos Kyprianou, served as a European Commissioner from 2004 to 2008 and Minister of Foreign Affairs of Cyprus.

Death
Spyros Kyprianou died on 12 March 2002 after a long fight with cancer. He was survived by his wife, Mimi Pagathrokliton, and their two sons. His widow, former first lady Mimi Kyprianou, died on 22 November 2021.

Honours and awards
 : Grand Collar of the Order of the White Lion (11 June 1980)
 : Order of José Martí (1987)
 : Grand Collar of the Order of Isabella the Catholic (1987)

References

External links

1932 births
2002 deaths
20th-century presidents of Cyprus
People from Limassol
Democratic Party (Cyprus) politicians
Cyprus Ministers of Foreign Affairs
Presidents of the House of Representatives (Cyprus)
Leaders of political parties in Cyprus
Cypriot people of the Cyprus Emergency
Deaths from cancer in Cyprus
20th-century Cypriot lawyers